Larry Boggs (born September 4, 1946) is an American politician who served as a member of the Oklahoma Senate for the 7th district from 2012 to 2021.

References

1946 births
Living people
Republican Party Oklahoma state senators
21st-century American politicians
People from Latimer County, Oklahoma